Thomas Rothmaler Mitchell (May 1783November 2, 1837) was a U.S. Representative from South Carolina.

Born in Georgetown, South Carolina, in May 1783, Mitchell graduated from Harvard University in 1802, where he studied law.  He was admitted to the bar in 1808, and commenced practice in Georgetown, South Carolina.

He served as member of the state house of representatives, 1809 and 1814–1819. Mitchell was elected as a Democratic-Republican to the Seventeenth Congress (March 4, 1821 – March 3, 1823).  He was an unsuccessful candidate for reelection in 1822 to the Eighteenth Congress.  He was then elected as a Jacksonian to the Nineteenth and Twentieth Congresses (March 4, 1825 – March 3, 1829).  He was an unsuccessful candidate for reelection in 1828 to the Twenty-first Congress.

He was reelected as a Jacksonian to the Twenty-second Congress (March 4, 1831– March 3, 1833).  He was an unsuccessful candidate for reelection in 1832 to the Twenty-third Congress.

He died in Georgetown, South Carolina, November 2, 1837.

References

Sources

Harvard University alumni
1783 births
1837 deaths
Democratic-Republican Party members of the United States House of Representatives from South Carolina
Jacksonian members of the United States House of Representatives from South Carolina
19th-century American politicians